The Västergötland Runic Inscription 81  is a 12th century runestone engraved in Old Norse with the Younger Futhark runic alphabet. It is in the form of a grave slab and it was found in the old cemetery of Broddetorp in Falköping Municipality, but it is presently located in the Västergötland Museum in Skara.

Inscription
Transliteration of the runes into Latin characters

 ben(d)ikt · romfarari : let (g)era : hualf : þenna : ifir · ma(g)nus · (k)oþan dræ(g) · ------s... ¶ ok : d(o) : (h)(a)n om nat : firir · þeira : postla : messo(a)ftan : simonis : æð iute : in þat er · ret · hu... ...

Old Norse transcription:

 

English translation:

 "Bendikt Rome-traveller had this vault made over Magnus, a good valiant man ... And he died in the night before the eve of the mass of the apostles Simonis et Juda. And that is right for everyone ... "

References

12th-century inscriptions
Runestones in Västergötland